The International Statistical Institute (ISI) is a professional association of statisticians. It was founded in 1885, although there had been international statistical congresses since 1853. The institute has about 4,000 elected members from government, academia, and the private sector. The affiliated Associations have membership open to any professional statistician. The institute publishes a variety of books and journals, and holds an international conference every two years. The biennial convention was commonly known as the ISI Session; however, since 2011, it is now referred to as the ISI World Statistics Congress. The permanent office of the institute is located in the Statistics Netherlands building in Leidschenveen (The Hague), in the Netherlands.

Specialized Associations
ISI serves as an umbrella for seven specialized Associations:

Bernoulli Society for Mathematical Statistics and Probability (BS)
International Association for Statistical Computing (IASC)
International Association for Official Statistics (IAOS)
International Association of Survey Statisticians (IASS)
International Association for Statistical Education (IASE)
International Society for Business and Industrial Statistics (ISBIS)
The International Environmetrics Society (TIES)

Committees
ISI Committees fall under one of three categories: operational, special interest, and outreach.

Current Special Interest Groups are:
Agricultural sciences
Astrostatistics
History of statistics
Professional ethics
Promotion of statistics in the life sciences
Risk analysis
Sports statistics
Statistics of travel and tourism
Women in statistics

Journals
ISI publishes the following journals:
 Bulletin of the International Statistical Institute
International Statistical Review
Statistical Theory and Method Abstracts
Bernoulli
Computational Statistics & Data Analysis
Statistics Education Research Journal
Statistics Surveys

Karl Pearson Prize
The Karl Pearson Prize was commenced by the ISI in 2013 to acknowledge contributions, which must be a research article or book published within the last three decades, on statistical theory, methodology, practice, or applications. The prize was named after English statistician Karl Pearson. It is bestowed biennially at the ISI World Statistics Congress. The winner of the prize receives 5,000 euros and gives the Karl Pearson Lecture.

Peter McCullagh and John Nelder were the winners of the inaugural Karl Pearson Prize "for their monograph Generalized Linear Models (1983)".

Presidents of ISI 
The organization has had thirty-six presidents.
The current president is Steve Penneck. 

1885 - 1899 Sir Rawson W. Rawson (England)
1899 - 1908  (Austria)
1909 - 1920 Luigi Bodio (Italy)
1923 - 1931  (France)
1931 - 1936  (Germany)
1936 - 1947 Armand Julin (Belgium)
1947 - 1947 Walter Francis Willcox (USA)
1947 - 1953 Stuart A. Rice (USA)
1953 - 1960 Georges Darmois (France)
1960 - 1963 Marcello Boldrini (Italy)
1963 - 1967 Sir Harry Campion (England)
1967 - 1971 William Gemmell Cochran (USA)
1971 - 1975 Petter Jakob Bjerve (Norway)
1975 - 1977 Milos Macura (Yugoslavia)
1977 - 1979 Calyampudi Radhakrishna Rao (India)
1979 - 1981 Edmond Malinvaud (France)
1981 - 1983 Enrique Cansado (Chile)
1983 - 1985 James Durbin (England)
1985 - 1987 Sigeiti Moriguti (Japan)
1987 - 1989 Ivan P. Fellegi (Canada)
1989 - 1991 Gunnar Kulldorff (Sweden)
1991 - 1993 Frederick Mosteller (USA)
1993 - 1995 Jayanta Kumar Ghosh (India)
1995 - 1997 Sir David R. Cox (England)
1997 - 1999 Willem R. van Zwet (Netherlands)
1999 - 2001 Jean-Louis Bodin (France)
2001 - 2003 Dennis Trewin (Australia)
2003 - 2005 Stephen M. Stigler (USA)
2005 - 2007 Niels Keiding (Denmark)
2007 - 2009 Denise A. Lievesley (England)
2009 - 2011 Jef L. Teugels (Belgium)
2011 - 2013 Jae Chang Lee (Korea)
2013 - 2015 Vijayan Nair (USA)
2015 - 2017 Pedro Luis do Nascimento Silva (Brazil)
2017 - 2019 Helen MacGillivray (Australia)
2019 - 2021 A. John Bailer (USA)
2021 - 2023 Steve Penneck (UK)

Notable members

 Horatio C. Burchard
 R. G. D. Allen

See also 
 Royal Statistical Society of Belgium
 Pablo Ferrari
 United Nations Statistical Commission
 World Health Organization
 Beatrix of the Netherlands

References

External links
International Statistical Institute
History. Stephen Stigler, International Statistical Institute.
International Statistical Institute, YouTube.

 
Organizations established in 1885
International learned societies